Terrill G. Bouricius (born March 27, 1954) is an American politician who served in the Vermont House of Representatives from the Chittenden-7-4 district from 1991 to 2001, as a member of the Vermont Progressive Party. Prior to his tenure in the state house, he served on the city council in Burlington, Vermont, from 1981 to 1991, from the 2nd district, and served as president of the city council.

Bouricius was born in New Mexico, and educated at Middlebury College. He entered politics with his activity in the Liberty Union Party, where he served as chair of the Addison County affiliate and the statewide party, and ran for a seat in the Vermont Senate twice with their nomination. He left the Liberty Union Party to aid in the creation of the Citizens Party, and ran for state senate and lieutenant governor.

Bouricius was elected to the city council in Burlington, becoming the first member of the Citizens Party elected in the United States. He was an ally to Mayor Bernie Sanders, and served one term as president of the city council. He ran for a seat in the state house in 1986, and lost by six votes to Ben Truman, but later defeated Truman in the 1990 election and served until his retirement in 2000. He and Tom Smith were the first members of the Progressive Coalition elected to the state house.

Early life and education

Terrill G. Bouricius was born in New Mexico on March 27, 1954. He graduated from Middlebury College with a Bachelor of Arts degree in political science in 1976. He married Catherine Lamb, with whom he had two children.

Career

Early campaigns

Bouricius announced that he would run for a seat in the Vermont Senate from Addison County with the nomination of the Liberty Union Party during the 1976 election, but placed fifth out of five candidates. Bouricius ran for one of six seats to the state senate from Chittenden County with the Liberty Union Party's nomination, but placed last. During the 1980 election he ran for the Democratic nomination for a seat in the state senate from Chittenden County, but lost in the primary. However, the Citizens Party later gave him their nomination to run, but he placed eighth out of nine candidates.

Bouricius served as chair of the Liberty Union Party in Addison County. Bouricius was selected to serve as chair of the Liberty Union Party after Bernie Sanders left the party in 1977, and served until he was replaced by Jack Craven following his resignation in 1978. In 1980, Earl Gardner, Jame Franco, and Bouricius, who were all former members of the Liberty Union Party, aided in the creation of the Citizens Party in Vermont.

Bouricius ran for lieutenant governor in the 1982 election and was endorsed by the party at its state convention. He won the Citizens nomination without opposition, but lost in the election won by Republican nominee Peter Plympton Smith. He was the Citizens' candidate to receive the most support statewide in the 1982 election, but the party lost major party status, which it had gained after the 1980 election, as none of their statewide candidates received more than 5% of the popular vote.

Local politics

Elections

Bouricius was given the Citizens nomination to run for a seat on the city council in Burlington, Vermont, from the 2nd district in 1981. Marion Fisher, the incumbent Democratic member of the city council, refused to debate Bouricius. Bouricius defeated Fisher in the election becoming the first member of the Citizens Party elected to office in the United States.

He won reelection in the 1983 election against Democratic nominee Esther Sorrell, a former member of the state senate, after spending $617 against Sorrell's $641. He won reelection in the 1985 election against Democratic nominee John H. Bartlett Jr. with the nomination of the Progressive Coalition. He won reelection in the 1987 election against Democratic nominee Rick Sharp after raising $1,630, raising $2,088, and having a remaining debt of $458. Bouricius sought reelection to the city council instead of seeking the mayoralty in the 1989 election and defeated Democratic nominee Ian C. Galbraith and Liberty Union nominee Ian Garth Diamondstone. Dana Clark was elected in the 1991 election to succeed Bouricius.

Bouricius, Jonathan Leopold, the city treasurer, and Peter Clavelle, the Community and Economic Development Director, were considered the most likely candidates for the coalition's nomination for the 1989 mayoral election. Gene Bergman, the chair of the coalition, stated that he believed the choices at the caucus would be Leopold, Bouricius, and Clavelle. Bouricius offered his name for consideration, but did not actively campaign for the endorsement of the coalition. Bouricius gave a speech at the caucus giving his support to Clavelle who won the coalition's nomination.

Tenure

Bernie Sanders, who had been endorsed by the Citizens Party, defeated incumbent Democratic Mayor Gordon Paquette by ten votes in the 1981 mayoral election. Following his victory in the 1981 election Sanders faced difficulties with the city council due to eleven of the thirteen members of the board of alderman opposing Sanders. The council would oppose measures proposed by Sanders and override his vetoes on legislation. Bouricius and Sadie White were the only members of the city council aligned with Sanders. 

After the 1982 elections there were five pro-Sanders members on the thirteen-member city council. However, the Republicans and Democratic members of the city council united to select Robert Paterson, a Republican, as president of the city council instead of Sadie White, a Sanders supporter, by a vote of eight to five after six ballots and to prevent the pro-Sanders members of the city council from receiving positions. 

The pro-Sanders members gained one seat from the Democratic Party during the 1984 city council elections bringing the composition of the city council to six Progressive members, five Republican members, and two Democratic members. Bouricius was selected to serve as president of the city council after thirty-one ballots and served until 1985. Bouricius was the only member of the Progressive Coalition to serve as president during Sanders' administration. Bouricius announced on December 26, 1984, that he would see reelection to the city council and that he would seek another term as president. After the 1985 elections William Skelton, a Republican member of the city council, was selected to serve as president of the city council against the Progressive-backed Zoe Breiner as Bouricius had dropped out.

During his tenure on the city council Bouricius served as chair of the Civil Defense committee. He was selected to serve on the executive committee of the Progressive Coalition in 1988. Bouricius worked as Sanders' treasurer for his campaign for a seat in the United States House of Representatives in the 1988 election.

Vermont House of Representatives

Elections

On June 25, 1986, Bouricius announced that he would run for a seat in the Vermont House of Representatives from the Chittenden 7-4 district to succeed Democratic Representative Howard Dean. He ran as an independent candidate, but was defeated by Democratic nominee Ben Truman by one vote. Bouricius filed for a recount no November 8, but Truman's victory was increased to six votes by the recount. He requested for a new election to be held, but Judge Matthew Katz rejected the request.

Bouricius announced that he would run for a seat in the state house in the 1990 election against incumbent Representative Truman. During the campaign Bouricius had been endorsed by Sanders, the Vermont Progressive Alliance, and the Rainbow Coalition. Bouricius defeated Truman in the election. Bouricius and Tom Smith were the first members of the Progressive Coalition elected to the state house and the first members of a third-party elected to the state legislature in seventy-four years.

He won reelection without opposition in the 1992, 1996, and 1998 elections. He defeated Democratic nominee Thomas C. Nuovo in the 1994 election. Bouricius did not run for reelection to the state house in the 2000 election and was succeeded by Progressive nominee Carina Driscoll.

Tenure

Bouricius supported Ralph G. Wright for Speaker of the House in 1991. During his tenure in the state house Bouricius served on the Commerce, Ways and Means, and Agriculture committees, but he stated that he was placed on the Agriculture committee as punishment for trying to get other Progressives elected.

Later life

During the 2002 gubernatorial election Bouricius supported Progressive nominee Michael Badamo. He became a policy analyst for FairVote. He endorsed David Zuckerman for lieutenant governor during the 2016 election. During the 2019 elections he supported Perri Freeman for a seat on the Burlington city council.

Political positions

In 1992, Bouricius sponsored legislation to increase the minimum wage in Vermont from $4.25 to $5.50. Bouricius supported legislation to ban smoking in public areas in 1993. He supported the creation of a single-payer healthcare system. In 2000, the state house voted seventy-six to sixty-nine, with Bouricius in favor, in favor of legislation to allow same-sex couples to have marriage benefits through civil unions.

Foreign policy

Fergus O'Hare, a civil rights activist from Northern Ireland, asked for members of the city council to introduce a resolution calling for the British government to give prisoners in the H-Block wing of the Maze Prison political status. Bouricius introduced the resolution for O'Hare. In 1983, the city council voted eight to five, with Bouricius in favor, against a resolution protesting the United States Department of State's decision to ban Soviet diplomats, journalists, and businessmen from entering Chittenden County. Bouricius opposed President Ronald Reagan's decision to implement an embargo against Nicaragua. Bouricius criticized President George H. W. Bush's plan to send $3 million to anti-Sandinista National Liberation Front candidates in Nicaragua's 1990 elections.

Government

Bouricius proposed a change to Burlington's city charter which would have changed the Board of Aldermen to the gender-neutral city council which the city council voted nine to four in favor of the legislation and was approved by a referendum. He supported the abolition of the Vermont Senate.

Electoral history

References

Bibliography

(2013) Democracy through Multi-body Sortition .
(2013) An Idealized Design for the Legislative Branch of Government .
(2014) An Idealized Design for Government .
(2018) Why Hybrid Bicameralism is Not Right for Sortition .

1954 births
20th-century American politicians
21st-century American politicians
American political scientists
Living people
Members of the Vermont House of Representatives
Vermont Progressive Party politicians